James Murphy (born 17 November 1971) is an English former professional footballer who played in the Football League as a striker.

References
Profile at ENFA

1971 births
Living people
Footballers from Islington (district)
English footballers
Association football midfielders
Leyton Orient F.C. players
Aldershot F.C. players
English Football League players